Harrison County School Board is the operating school district within Harrison County, West Virginia. It is governed by the Harrison County Board of Education and serves over 11,200 students in Harrison County. Dora Stutler is the current superintendent.  The current members of the board of education are Mary Francis Smith, Frank Devono, Jr., Gary Hamrick, Doug Hogue, and William "Tom" Tucker.

Schools

High schools
 Bridgeport High School 
 Liberty High School 
 Lincoln High School 
 Robert C. Byrd High School 
 South Harrison High School 
 United High School

Middle schools
 Bridgeport Middle School 
 Lincoln Middle School 
 Mountaineer Middle School 
 South Harrison Middle School 
 Washington Irving Middle School

Elementary schools
 Big Elm Elementary School 
 Johnson Elementary School 
 Lost Creek Elementary School 
 Lumberport Elementary School 
 North View Elementary School 
 Norwood Elementary School 
 Nutter Fort Primary 
 Nutter Fort Intermediate 
 Salem Elementary School 
 Simpson Elementary School 
 Victory Elementary School 
 West Milford Elementary School

Technical schools
 United Technical Center

Former Schools 
Adamston Elementary School 
Bridgeport Jr. High School
Bristol High School
Central Jr. High School
Clarksburg High School
Gore Middle School 
Harden Elementary School
Kelly Miller High School 
Linden Elementary School 
Lost Creek High School 
Lumberport Middle School
Lumberport High School
Morgan Elementary School 
Roosevelt-Wilson High School 
Salem High School 
Salem Middle School
Shinnston High School
Summit Park Elementary School
Towers Elementary School
Van Horn Elementary School
Victory High School 
Washington Irving High School
Wilsonburg Elementary School

References

External links
Harrison County Schools

School districts in West Virginia
Education in Harrison County, West Virginia